Kelli Barrett (born January 26, 1984) is an American actress.

Biography
Kelli Barrett was raised by a single mother in Virginia Beach, Virginia. As a child, she showed interest in acting after seeing Merrily We Roll Along on stage. She sang all the time with her mother stating "She’ll either be a lawyer or an actress because [she] loved to argue." Barrett attended the Governor's School for the Arts before attending University of the Arts in Philadelphia.

Barrett booked recurring roles on television shows including As the World Turns, Chicago Fire and I Just Want My Pants Back. She made minor appearances on The Good Wife, Person of Interest, Ugly Betty and Blue Bloods. She became part of the Marvel Cinematic Universe by portraying Maria Castle in Marvel's The Punisher.

Personal life
Barrett married actor Jarrod Spector on October 26, 2014.

Filmography

Stage

References

External links
 
 

Living people
1984 births
Actresses from Virginia
People from Virginia Beach, Virginia
American television actresses
American stage actresses
21st-century American women